Elkridge may refer to a location in the eastern United States:

Elkridge, Maryland, a census-designated place in Howard County
Elkridge Site, a nearby archeological site
Elkridge Furnace Complex, National Register of Historic Places designation for the same historic site
Elkridge Landing Middle School

See also
Elk Ridge (disambiguation)